Benita Jones (formally known as Benita Jones Washington) (born April 23, 1976) is an American gospel musician, recording artist, singer, songwriter, and worship leader. She (B. Washington) started her music career, in 2004, with the release of Hold On by Light Records. This album was her breakthrough on the Billboard magazine charts, debuting at number 6 on the Gospel Albums chart. Since her debut album in 2004, Jones has released four more projects to date.  

Her current album "The Entreating" is a body a work full of original praise and worship songs co-written and co-produced by Jones. 

Jones currently resides in Atlanta, GA where she is serving as worship pastor at her local church.

Early life
Jones was born on April 23, 1976, in Selma, Alabama, as Benita Jones. She went to the University of Alabama, in Tuscaloosa, AL, where she studied Voice Performance. She won the Gospel Dream contest in Atlanta, Georgia in July 2003 which propelled her individual musical career.

Music career
Her music career started in 2004, with the release of Hold On, by Light Records on July 13, 2004. Her career debut single "Thank You" would be her breakthrough release. Garnering her Billboard magazine placement on the Gospel Albums at No. 6 and at the No. 35 position on the Independent Albums chart. She was also nominated for the Soul Train Lady Of Soul award in the Best Gospel Album category. As a background vocalist for CeCe Winans, Donnie McClurkin and Juanita Bynum, she broke through as a featured artist on a national CeCe Winans tour.   

She released her subsequent album, Renaissance-Live in Nashville, with ReddApple Seed Entertainment on February 13, 2007. The album would chart on the Gospel Albums chart at No. 17. Her third album, The Word Remains, was released by Shanachie Records on June 29, 2010.

Partnered with Integrity Music and Tyscot Records, Benita released her fifth project, "The Entreating" July 10, 2020.

Benita served as Worship Leader and Overseer of Worship at Mount Zion Baptist Church Nashville, TN for 15 years.

Personal life
Jones married Delvin Washington in 2001 and later divorced in 2017.  They have two children together.

Discography

Albums

Chart position
2020 
"Good God"
 #7 Billboard Gospel Digital Songs
 #30 Billboard Gospel Airplay
 #29 Mediabase Gospel Airplay

2004 
"Thank You" (Light Records)
 #3 Hot Gospel Songs

ALBUMS AS BENITA JONES
2018 
"The Evolution" (B Sides)
 #3 Billboard Gospel Album Sales

ALBUMS AS BENITA WASHINGTON
2007
"Renaissance" (ReddApple Seed)
 #17 Top Gospel Albums

2004 
"Hold On" (Light Records)
 #6 Top Gospel Albums
 #1 Heat Seekers- Mountain

References

External links
Official website
Official Facebook
Official YouTube

1976 births
Living people
African-American songwriters
African-American Christians
Musicians from Nashville, Tennessee
Musicians from Alabama
Songwriters from Alabama
Songwriters from Tennessee
21st-century African-American people
20th-century African-American people